Galleriini is a tribe of moths of the subfamily Galleriinae.

Genera 
In alphabetical order:
Achroia Hübner, [1819]
Cathayia Hampson, 1901
Chevalierella Ghesquière, 1943
Dinopleura Turner, 1942
Eloeidiphilos Praviel, 1938
Galleria Fabricius, 1798
Pseudarenipses Speidel & Schmitz, 1991
Trachylepidia Ragonot, 1887

References 

 Clarke, J.F.G., 1986: Pyralidae and Microlepidoptera of the Marquesas Archipelago. Smithsonian Contributions to Zoology 416: 1-485.

External links